Deh-e Shadi (also Romanized as Deh-e Shādī) is a village in Kavir Rural District, Deyhuk District, Tabas County, South Khorasan Province, Iran. At the 2006 census, its population was 46, in 12 families.

References 

Populated places in Tabas County